"Moja štikla" was the  entry in the Eurovision Song Contest 2006, performed in Croatian by Severina. The song was chosen to represent Croatia after winning Dora 2006, Croatia's national final.

Composition 
The song itself was described in commentary as being in the turbo-folk style, with Vučković singing about various chat-up attempts from local men, as well as entering into folk-influenced call-and-response lyrics with her backing singers.

Eurovision Song Contest

Dora 2006 
Dora 2006 was the fourteenth edition of the Croatian national selection Dora which selected Croatia's entry for the Eurovision Song Contest 2006. The competition consisted of two semi-finals on 2 and 3 March 2006 and a final on 4 March 2006, all taking place at the Hotel Kvarner in Opatija and broadcast on HTV 1. Dora 2006 consisted of three shows: two semi-finals on 2 and 3 March 2006 and a final on 4 March 2006. Sixteen songs competed in each semi-final and eight proceeded to the final to complete the sixteen-song lineup in the final. The results of all shows were determined by a 50/50 combination of votes from a jury panel and a public televote.

HRT directly invited thirty-two artists and composers to participate in the competition. HRT announced the competing entries on 10 February 2006.

"Moja štikla" was performed in the second semi-final, performing as the last song of the semi-final. The song qualified from the final, earning a combined 30 points for second place in the semi-final.

The final took place on 4 March 2006, with the sixteen qualifiers from the preceding two semi-finals competing. The winner was determined by a 50/50 combination of votes from a five-member jury panel and a public televote. Ties were decided in favour of the entry ranked higher by the jury. "Moja štikla" would win the final by two points over Kraljevi ulice's song "Kao san", with "Moja štikla" earning 30 points. As a result, the song was selected to represent Croatia in the Eurovision Song Contest 2006.

At Eurovision 
Despite Croatia's previous entry, "Vukovi umiru sami", having finished eleventh, Croatia was the beneficiary of the controversy surrounding the national final of Serbia and Montenegro, in which No Name was forced to withdraw from the contest. Therefore, Croatia would take over Serbia and Montenegro's spot as an automatic qualifier.

The song was performed twentieth on the night, following 's Virginie Pouchain with "Il était temps" and preceding 's Brian Kennedy with "Every Song Is a Cry for Love". At the close of voting, it had received 56 points, placing equal 12 in a field of 24 and returning Croatia to the semi-final for the Eurovision Song Contest 2007.

The performance featured the combination of traditionally-dressed Balkan folk musicians and Vučković herself in a red dress. The dress was partly removed (in a move made famous by Bucks Fizz in their performance of "Making Your Mind Up") during the performance.

It was succeeded as Croatian representative at the 2007 contest by Dragonfly featuring Dado Topić with "Vjerujem u ljubav".

The song was on Vučković's 2006 extended play, Moja štikla / Moj sokole.

Parodies 
Its controversy and performance inspired a wide range of parodies, the most notable one being "U govno je stala moja štikla (Turbo folk štikla)" produced by Croatian comic artist Stevo Sinik. The video in question mocks the song, drawing the parallel that it has many elements of turbo folk, which doesn't represent the country. The parody's satirical lyrics and rustic style have contributed to the popularity of the song, and it became one of the most popular parodies in Croatia in 2006.

Charts

References

Eurovision songs of 2006
Eurovision songs of Croatia
2006 songs